Hotel Lights is the debut album by Hotel Lights, a pop/indie group. It was released in 2006.

Track listing
 "You Come and I Go" – 3:12
 "A.M. Slow Golden Hit" – 3:56
 "Miles Behind Me" – 4:09
 "I Am a Train" – 3:47
 "Small Town Shit" – 5:24
 "What You Meant" – 3:04
 "Follow Through" – 5:22
 "Stumblin' Home Winter Blues" – 3:02
 "Marvelous Truth" – 3:37
 "The Mumbling Years"
 "Anatole" – 4:00
 "Motionless" – 4:31
 "Love to Try" – 6:24

Personnel
 Darren Jessee – guitar, piano, vocals
 Chris Badger – guitar, piano
 Roger Gupton – electric bass, background vocals
 Mark Price – drums
 Alan Weatherhead – pedal steel

References

2006 debut albums